Calybitia is a monotypic snout moth genus. It was described by William Schaus in 1922 and contains the species Calybitia adolescens which is found in Guatemala.

References

Epipaschiinae
Monotypic moth genera
Moths of Central America
Pyralidae genera